Nicholas Bernard James Adam Byrne Jr. (born 9 October 1978) is an Irish pop singer, songwriter and radio and television presenter, best known for being a member of the pop group Westlife; he is the band's oldest member. Westlife has since released twelve albums, embarked on thirteen world tours, and won several awards, becoming one of the most successful musical groups of all time.

Before his music career, he played professional football, representing Republic of Ireland at several junior levels. Since then he has had a successful TV and radio presenting career. His wife Georgina is the daughter of former Taoiseach Bertie Ahern, and they have twin sons and a daughter.

In September 2012, it was announced that Byrne would be a contestant for the tenth series of Strictly Come Dancing. He was the ninth contestant to be eliminated. He was ranked number two on Ireland's Sexiest Man of 2014. After RTÉ internally chose him to represent Ireland, he released the song "Sunlight" and performed it in the second semi-final of the Eurovision Song Contest 2016 competition in Stockholm in May 2016, but failed to advance to the final.

Career

Football 

Byrne was a footballer and played for Home Farm and St. Kevins Boys in North Dublin. He became a professional player, and joined Leeds United as a goalkeeper in 1995, and was a squad member of the FA Youth Cup winning team of 1997. He played for Leeds for two years, leaving when his contract expired in June 1997. He played in a reserve game for Scarborough and in a trial game with Cambridge United, before returning to join Dublin club Shelbourne. He then signed for Cobh Ramblers playing 15 games in all competitions, then St. Francis F.C., all in Ireland's League of Ireland.

On 14 May 2009, Byrne was a substitute for a Liverpool Legends XI that played against an All Star XI in a Hillsborough Memorial match to mark the 20th anniversary of the Hillsborough disaster. All the proceeds from the match went to the Marina Dalglish appeal. He represented the Republic of Ireland at U15, U16 and U18 levels. He is a fan of Celtic FC, and on 9 August 2011 played in a Celtic Legends XI at Celtic Park in front of a crowd of 54,000 against a Manchester Utd Legends team. Byrne participated in and won Soccer Aid 2014. He scored in the match, played at Old Trafford. He was the only non-professional player to score in the match. The Rest of the World team won the game 4–2.

Music 

In June 1998, Byrne attended an audition for new Irish boyband, where Boyzone manager Louis Walsh approached him to join his new venture, Westlife. Byrne joined Westlife along with Kian Egan, Mark Feehily, Shane Filan and Brian McFadden. Byrne revealed in Westlife: Our Story that he had wanted to change the name of the band to West High; but the others preferred Westlife. With Westlife, Byrne has had 25 top ten UK singles, 14 of which were number one, 7 number one albums and has sold in excess of over 55 million records worldwide. It is certified that Westlife have sold 20.2 million records and videos in the UK across their 14-year career – 6.8 million singles, 11.9 million albums and 1.5 million videos. Byrne also had a number one single in Ireland in 2002, alongside the Republic of Ireland national football team and Dustin the Turkey with the Irish 2002 FIFA World Cup anthem, "Here Come The Good Times (Ireland)". He also co-wrote many of Westlife songs.

In early January 2016, it was rumored that RTÉ had internally chosen Byrne to represent Ireland in the Eurovision Song Contest 2016. Byrne had not yet confirmed or denied such information but announced that he would grab the opportunity with both hands if given. On 13 January, Byrne was confirmed to be the Irish singer for the 2016 contest in Stockholm with the song, "Sunlight". He performed in the second semi final on 12 May 2016, but failed to advance to the final.

In October 2018, a video was posted to Westlife's official social media platforms announcing the group's reunion as a four-piece. In 2019, the group headlined "The 20 Tour", named in honour of Westlife's 20th anniversary since its formation and the release of its first single, "Swear It Again", in 1999. In addition to touring, Westlife also released new music. "Hello My Love", the first single from the group's eleventh album, Spectrum, debuted on the Graham Norton Show on 10 and 11 January 2019.

Television 
In 2003, Byrne guest-hosted an edition of CD:UK with Cat Deeley.

Byrne hosted the closing ceremony of the Special Olympics live from Dublin's Croke Park in front of 80,000 spectators.

Throughout the years, Byrne has appeared on Children in Need and Comic Relief several times. In 2001, he co-hosted Children in Need live from Belfast and in 2011 and co-hosted a BBC Radio 2 radio special with Patrick Kielty for the cause.

Byrne has narrated stage shows such as The Snowman Christmas Special and the Picture of You documentary dedicated to former Boyzone member Stephen Gately, who died on 10 October 2009.

Byrne has also hosted the Cheerios ChildLine Concert a record seven times, which was broadcast on RTÉ2, and in more recent years on TV3.

In addition, Byrne presented several editions of the Celebrity Sunday radio programme on RTÉ 2fm in 2010. Listeners tuned in from as far and wide as Mexico, Chile, the United Kingdom, Philippines and Indonesia. The fourth and final edition of the programme, broadcast on 14 February 2010, trended worldwide on Twitter. FM104 publicly offered him a job the day Westlife announced their split.

In October 2012, Byrne hosted the RTÉ reality TV show Football's Next Star. The series followed ten young hopefuls competing for a chance to win a place with Celtic Football Club's youth squad.

In 2013 through 2015, and again in 2017 and 2018, Byrne presented the Irish votes at the Eurovision Song Contest. He also co-hosted the short-lived TV talent show The Hit on RTÉ One along with Aidan Power.

On 4 February 2014, Byrne signed a contract with RTÉ 2fm to host a new weekday show from 11am to 2pm.

In January 2015, Byrne started hosting the new weekly National Lottery game show The Million Euro Challenge on RTÉ 1, although the show was axed that July.

In January 2017, Byrne started hosting an Irish version of the TV show Dancing with the Stars, alongside Amanda Byram and with Jennifer Zamparelli from 2019.

In March 2019, Byrne left 2FM to rejoin the newly reunited Westlife.

In June 2020, he hosted RTÉ Does Comic Relief during the COVID-19 pandemic.

In October 2021, Byrne was announced as the host of a new singing competition commissioned for RTÉ entitled Last Singer Standing.

Discography

Albums

Singles

As lead artist

As featured artist

Songwriting 
Byrne has co-written some songs in his Westlife years and on all ten tracks on his debut solo album and also to one unreleased song:

"Sunlight"
"Explosion"
"Song For Lovers"
"Pop Machine"
"Still The One"
"Some Things Always Seem To Last"
"Finishing Line"
"Broadway Show"
"Thank You"
"Pretty"
"Talking with Jennifer"
"Sweeping Up"
"When You Come Around"
"Don't Let Me Go"
"Imaginary Diva"
"Reason For Living"
"Where We Belong"
"I Won't Let You Down"
"Singing Forever"
"You See Friends (I See Lovers)"
"I'm Missing Loving You"
"Closer"
"Last Mile of the Way"
"The Way That You Love Me"
"Alive"

Personal life 
Byrne was born to parents Yvonne and Nicholas (d. 2009). He has an older sister and a younger brother. Byrne married Georgina Ahern, whom he first met when they were about 12 years old,  on 5 August 2003 at the Wicklow Register Office, Wicklow, County Wicklow. The civil ceremony was followed by a church blessing on 9 August at the Roman Catholic Church of St Pierre et St Paul in Gallardon, Eure-et-Loir, France.

The couple have three children.

Philanthropy 

In 2010, Byrne and his family organised the 'Nikki Byrne Twilight Ball', a fundraising event, in memory of their father who died in November 2009. The event raised over €200,000 and completely funded a television and radio heart attack awareness campaign in connection with 'The Irish Heart Foundation'.

Television presenting career

Honours and awards

References

External links 
 

1978 births
20th-century Irish male singers
21st-century Irish male singers
Living people
Nicky
Association football goalkeepers
Cobh Ramblers F.C. players
Eurovision Song Contest entrants of 2016
Home Farm F.C. players
Eurovision Song Contest entrants for Ireland
Irish pop singers
League of Ireland players
Leeds United F.C. players
Republic of Ireland association footballers
RTÉ 2fm presenters
RTÉ television presenters
St Francis F.C. players
Shelbourne F.C. players
Westlife members
Ballad musicians
Musicians from Dublin (city)
Pop rock musicians
Power pop musicians
Folk-pop singers
Pop rock singers
RCA Records artists
Irish male singer-songwriters
Sony BMG artists
Syco Music artists
Universal Music Group artists
World Music Awards winners
Irish tenors
Irish baritones
Participants in British reality television series
Irish radio presenters
Irish television personalities
Irish game show hosts
Irish television presenters
British television presenters
Irish male dancers
Irish male film actors
Irish male stage actors
Irish expatriates in England
Singers from Dublin (city)
Dancers from Dublin (city)